Raffaello Fossi, styled RAFO (born Signa, 21 April 1928 - died there 8 January 1962) was an Italian painter.

References
Biography from the Comune of Signa (Italian)

20th-century Italian painters
20th-century Italian male artists
Italian male painters
People from Signa
1928 births
1962 deaths